Mustafa Necdet Üruğ (19 February 1921 – 18 April 2021) was a Turkish general and the nephew of Faruk Gürler.

Biography
He was Commander of the First Army of Turkey (1978 – 1981) during the 1980 military coup. After the coup he was Commander of the Turkish Army (1983), and Chief of the General Staff of Turkey (1983 – 1987), as well as Secretary-General of the Presidential Council (from 1983).

Üruğ died from complications of COVID-19 in Istanbul on 18 April 2021, at the age of 100, during the COVID-19 pandemic in Turkey.

References 

1921 births
2021 deaths
Chiefs of the Turkish General Staff
Men centenarians
Commanders of the Turkish Land Forces
Turkish Army generals
Turkish centenarians
Deaths from the COVID-19 pandemic in Turkey
Military personnel from Istanbul